Attanasio is a surname. Notable people with the surname include:
A. A. Attanasio (born 1951), American science fiction writer
Antonio Attanasio (1950–1982), Italian swimmer
Dino Attanasio (born 1925), comics artist
Gianluca Attanasio (born 1979), Italian composer, singer-songwriter and music producer
Luca Attanasio (1977–2021), Italian diplomat
Mark Attanasio (born 1957), American investment banker and owner of the Milwaukee Brewers
Orazio Attanasio (born 1959), Italian economist
Paul Attanasio (born 1959), American screenwriter and television producer

Italian-language surnames